A shrew rat or shrew-rat is not a true rat but a rodent that resembles a shrew in physical form and, presumably, lifestyle.  There are twelve known species distributed across seven known genera, all from island southeast Asia, specifically the Indonesian island of Sulawesi and several  islands of the Philippines:
Chrotomys, from the Philippines;
Isarog striped shrew-rat (Chrotomys gonzalesi)
Blazed Luzon shrew rat (Chrotomys silaceus)
Sibuyan striped shrew rat (Chrotomys sibuyanensis)
Crunomys, from Sulawesi and the Philippines;
 Celebes shrew rat (Crunomys celebensis)
 Northern Luzon shrew rat (Crunomys fallax)
 Mindanao shrew rat (Crunomys melanius)
Hyorhinomys, from Sulawesi; 
Hyorhinomys stuempkei
Melasmothrix, from Sulawesi;
Sulawesian shrew rat (Melasmothrix naso)
Paucidentomys, from Sulawesi;
 Paucidentomys vermidax
Rhynchomys, from the Philippines;
 Mount Data shrew rat (Rhynchomys soricoides) Thomas, 1895
Tateomys, from Sulawesi.
Long-tailed shrew rat (Tateomys macrocercus)
Tate's shrew rat (Tateomys rhinogradoides)

Animal common name disambiguation pages